Patrick or Addy Evans may refer to:
Patrick Evans (priest) (born 1943), Church of England clergyman
Patrick Evans (cricketer) (born 1960), Guyanese cricketer
Paddy Evans (cricketer) (born 1981), English cricketer
Patrick Evans, developer of NightMare

See also
Pat Evans (disambiguation)